Nagan Devanar, known in full as Madurai Tamil Koothan Nagan Devanar (Tamil: மதுரைத் தமிழ்க் கூத்தன் நாகன்தேவனார்), was a poet of the Sangam period, to whom a sole verse of the Sangam literature has been attributed, in addition to verse 12 of the Tiruvalluva Maalai.

Biography
Nagan Devanar was born as "Devanar" and lived in Madurai. He was known for his expertise in the ancient Tamil theatre.

Contribution to the Sangam literature
Nagan Devanar has written a sole Sangam verse—verse 164 of the Agananuru—apart from verse 12 of the Tiruvalluva Maalai.

Views on Valluvar and the Kural
Nagan Devanar opines about Valluvar and the Kural text thus:

See also

 Sangam literature
 List of Sangam poets
 Tiruvalluva Maalai

Notes

References

 
 
 

Tamil philosophy
Tamil poets
Sangam poets
Tiruvalluva Maalai contributors